The A5 motorway, called the Morava Corridor is a motorway in Serbia under construction and when finished it will span for approximately . It begins in Pojate, north of Kruševac, at the junction with A1 motorway and runs westward to Preljina near Čačak, where it will intersect with A2 motorway. The construction started in December 2019 with the main contractor Bechtel.

Route
The highway will mostly go through The West Morava Valley, and next to Šumadija District and Pomoravlje District on the northern side, and will connect directly the Rasina District, Raška District and Moravica District /, with combined population of about 760,000 inhabitants. There will be no tunnels, but some 78 bridges are planned on the route.

List of exits

References

External links

 Regulation of State Roads

Motorways in Serbia
Moravica District
Raška District
Rasina District
Transport in Serbia